Convolvulus pentapetaloides is a species of annual herb in the family Convolvulaceae. They have simple, broad leaves.

Sources

References

pentapetaloides
flora of Malta